The Return of Sophie Lang is a 1936 American drama film directed by George Archainbaud and written by Frederick Irving Anderson, Brian Marlow and Patterson McNutt. The film stars Gertrude Michael, Guy Standing, Ray Milland, Elizabeth Patterson, Colin Tapley and Paul Harvey. The film was released on June 18, 1936, by Paramount Pictures.

The Return of Sophie Lang is the second film of the Sophie Lang series, between The Notorious Sophie Lang (1934) and Sophie Lang Goes West (1937).

Plot

Cast 
 Gertrude Michael as Sophie Lang / Ethel Thomas
 Guy Standing as Max Bernard
 Ray Milland as Jimmy Dawson
 Elizabeth Patterson as Araminta Sedley
 Colin Tapley as Larry
 Paul Harvey as Insp. Parr
 Garry Owen as 'Nosey' Schwartz
 Don Rowan as 'Buttons' McDermott
 Purnell Pratt as Thomas Chadwick
 Ellen Drew as Secretary
 Ted Oliver as Detective #1
 James Blaine as Detective #2

References

External links 
 

1936 films
American drama films
1936 drama films
Paramount Pictures films
Films directed by George Archainbaud
American black-and-white films
1930s English-language films
1930s American films